Battle of Bangkok may refer to:

 Siege of Bangkok, the 1688 siege of the French fortress in Bangkok by Siamese forces
 Military encounter at Samut Prakan in 1941, see Japanese invasion of Thailand
 1933 Battle of Bangkok, see History of Thailand (1932–1973)
 1893 French Siege of Bangkok, see Military history of Thailand#Siam and the European military threat (1826–1932)
 2010 Thai military crackdown, the military crackdown on the anti-government Red Shirt protesters in Bangkok